Melika Mohammadi (born 28 March 2000) is an Iranian footballer who plays as a right back or a centre back for the Iran women's national team. She plays for Bam Khatoon F.C in Iranian Women's Football League.

International career
Mohammadi capped for Iran at senior level during the 2022 AFC Women's Asian Cup qualification.

References 

2000 births
Living people
People from Shiraz
Iranian women's footballers
Women's association football fullbacks
Women's association football central defenders
Iran women's international footballers
Sportspeople from Fars province
21st-century Iranian women